Heredia is a village in Álava, Basque Country, Spain.

References 

Populated places in Álava